The Metal Opera: Pt 1 & 2 – Gold Edition is a box set by German band Avantasia, released through the band's former label AFM Records on March 6, 2008. The set contains Avantasia's first two albums (The Metal Opera and The Metal Opera Part II) on two gold CDs, a 44-page booklet with the storyline, rare photos, liner notes, and an interview with project mastermind Tobias Sammet; all inside a luxury leather box.

Track listing

CD 1 
 Prelude
 Reach Out for the Light
 Serpents in Paradise
 Malleus Maleficarum
 Breaking Away
 Farewell
 The Glory of Rome
 In Nomine Patris
 Avantasia
 A New Dimension
 Inside
 Sign of the Cross
 The Tower
 Avantasia (bonus radio single)

CD 2 
 The Seven Angels
 No Return
 The Looking Glass
 In Quest for
 The Final Sacrifice
 Neverland
 Anywhere
 Chalice of Agony
 Memory
 Into the Unknown
 Sign of the Cross (Live bonus track) – Audio
 Sign of the Cross (Live bonus track) – Video

Personnel (The Avantasians) 
Tobias Sammet – (bass, keyboards, vocals)
Henjo Richter – (guitar)
Markus Grosskopf – (bass)
Alex Holzwarth – (drums)
Michael Kiske – (vocals)
Andre Matos – (vocals)
Bob Catley – (vocals)
Kai Hansen – (vocals)
David DeFeis – (vocals)
Rob Rock – (vocals)
Oliver Hartmann – (vocals)
Sharon den Adel – (vocals)
Ralf Zdiarstek – (vocals)
Timo Tolkki – (guitar, vocals)
Jens Ludwig – (guitar)
Norman Meiritz – (guitar)
Frank Tischer – (keyboards)

Avantasia albums
2008 compilation albums
AFM Records compilation albums
Concept albums